This is a list of athletes and teams who have won honours while representing Dublin GAA in Gaelic games (i.e. football, hurling, etc).

Men's Football

GAA All Stars Awards winners (football): 140

1963: Paddy Holden*, Des Foley*, Mickey Whelan*
1964: Paddy Holden*2nd 
1965: Paddy Holden*3rd, Des Foley*2nd

Records
6 All Stars: Cluxton, Kilkenny
5 All Stars: Fenton, O'Leary
4 All Stars: B. Brogan Jnr, J. McCaffrey, McCarthy, Cullen, Flynn, Kelleher, Drumm
3 All Stars: A. Brogan, O'Toole, B. Rock, Redmond, O'Sullivan, O'Callaghan, D. Rock, Keaveney, Fitzsimons, Curran, Mannion
2 All Stars: Doyle, Howard, Mullins, Whelan, Hickey, Connolly, O'Driscoll, Hargan, Cooper, Barr, Duff, MacAuley, McMahon, O'Carroll

All Stars Young Footballer of the Year
2017: Con O'Callaghan

All Stars Footballer of the Year
2010: Bernard Brogan Jnr
2011: Alan Brogan
2013: Michael Darragh Macauley
2015: Jack McCaffrey
2018: Brian Fenton
2019: Stephen Cluxton
2020: Brian Fenton

Texaco Footballer of the Year
1963: Lar Foley
1974: Kevin Heffernan
1976: Jimmy Keaveney
1977: Jimmy Keaveney2nd
1983: Tommy Drumm
1995: Paul Curran
2010: Bernard Brogan Jnr
2011: Alan Brogan

GPA Gaelic Football Team of the Year
2006: Stephen Cluxton, Bryan Cullen, Alan Brogan
2007: Stephen Cluxton2nd, Barry Cahill, Alan Brogan2nd
2010: Philly McMahon, Bernard Brogan Jnr*
2010 was the final year of the GPA Gaelic Football Team of the Year and the GPA Footballer of the Year as it was amalgamated with the All Star Awards.

GPA footballer of the year
2010: Bernard Brogan Jnr

Under 21 Footballer of the Year
2010: Rory O'Carroll
2012: Ciarán Kilkenny
2014: Conor McHugh
2017: Aaron Byrne

Under 20 Footballer of the Year
2019: Ciarán Archer

All-Ireland Senior Football Championships: 30

All-Ireland Under-21 Football Championships: 5

All-Ireland Minor Football Championships: 11

All-Ireland Junior Football Championships: 6

National Football Leagues: 13

Leinster Senior Football Championships: 59
 1891, 1892, 1894, 1896, 1897, 1898, 1899, 1901, 1902, 1904, 1906, 1907, 1908, 1920, 1921, 1922, 1923, 1924, 1932, 1933, 1934, 1941, 1942, 1955, 1958, 1959, 1962, 1963, 1965, 1974, 1975, 1976, 1977, 1978, 1979, 1983, 1984, 1985, 1989, 1992, 1993, 1994, 1995, 2002, 2005, 2006, 2007, 2008, 2009, 2011, 2012, 2013, 2014, 2015, 2016, 2017, 2018, 2019, 2020
|

Leinster Under-21 Football Championships: 14

Leinster Minor Football Championships: 33
1930, 1933, 1934, 1945, 1946, 1948, 1949, 1954, 1955, 1956, 1958, 1959, 1961, 1968, 1970, 1971, 1976, 1978, 1979, 1981, 1982, 1984, 1986, 1988, 1994, 1999, 2001, 2003, 2009, 2011, 2012, 2014, 2017

Leinster Junior Football Championships: 20
1908, 1914, 1916, 1922, 1926, 1930, 1939, 1948, 1950, 1951, 1954, 1955, 1959, 1960, 1971, 1983, 1985, 1987, 1994, 2008

O'Byrne Cup: 9
 1956, 1958, 1960, 1966, 1999, 2007, 2008, 2015, 2017

Gerry Reilly Cup: 6
1993, 1998, 2006, 2008 (U17 Blitz), 2012, 2013

Ladies Football

All Stars

All-Ireland Senior Ladies' Football Championship
Winners: 2010, 2017, 2018, 2019, 2020: 5
Runners up: 2003, 2004, 2009, 2014, 2015, 2016, 2021: 7

Leinster Senior Ladies' Football Championship
Winners:  2003, 2004, 2005, 2008, 2009, 2010, 2012, 2013, 2014, 2015, 2016, 2017, 2018, 2019: 14  ?

Ladies' National Football League
Division One  
Winners: 2018: 1
Runners up: 2014 : 1
Division Two 
Winners: 2007

All-Ireland Junior Ladies' Football Championship
 1989

All-Ireland Under-18 Ladies' Football Championship
Winners: 2008, 2012: 2
Runners up: 1990, 2007, 2011, 2013, 2016 : 5

All-Ireland Under-16 Ladies' Football Championship: 2
Winners: 1989, 2006, 2010: 3
Runners up: 2005, 2011, 2013, 2014, 2016 : 5

All-Ireland Under-14 Ladies' Football Championship
Winners: 2004, 2005, 2007: 3
Runners up: 2006, 2010, 2011, 2018 : 4

Leinster Minor A Football Championship
 2008

Men's Hurling

All-Ireland Senior Hurling Championships: 6

All-Ireland Under-21 Hurling Championships: None

All-Ireland Minor Hurling Championships: 4
1945, 1946, 1954, 1965

All-Ireland Junior Hurling Championships: 3
 1932, 1937, 1952

National Hurling Leagues: 3
1929, 1939, 2011

Leinster Senior Hurling Championship: 24
1889, 1892, 1894, 1896, 1902, 1906, 1908, 1917, 1919, 1920, 1921, 1924, 1927, 1928, 1930, 1934, 1938, 1941, 1942, 1944, 1948, 1952, 1961, 2013

Leinster Under-21 Hurling Championship: 5

 1967, 1972, 2007, 2010, 2011

Leinster Minor Hurling Championships: 15

1928, 1938, 1945, 1946, 1947, 1952, 1953, 1954, 1965, 1983.

Leinster Junior Hurling Championship: 8
1908, 1925, 1932, 1937, 1947, 1950, 1952, 1955

Leinster Intermediate Hurling Championship: 4
1966, 1968, 1970, 1972.

Walsh Cup: 5
1960, 1964, 1966, 2003, 2011.

Walsh Shield: 1 
2009.

Kehoe Cup: 1
1981.

GAA All Stars Awards winners (hurling): 8

 1971: M. Bermingham
 1990: B. McMahon
 2009: Alan McCrabbe
 2011: Liam Rushe Gary Maguire
 2013: Peter Kelly, Liam Rushe, Danny Sutcliffe

Record
2 Awards - Liam Rushe 2

Camogie

All-Ireland Senior Camogie Championship: 26
(click on year for team line-outs) 
1932, 1933, 1937, 1938, 1942, 1943, 1944, 1948, 1949, 1950, 1951, 1952, 1953, 1954, 1955,  1957, 1958, 1959, 1960, 1961, 1962, 1963, 1964, 1965, 1966, 1984

All-Ireland Junior Camogie Championship: 5
1970, 1971, 1975, 2005, 2006

All Ireland under-16 camogie championship: 2
 1982
 2012

All-Ireland Intermediate Camogie Championship: 1
 1992

National Camogie League: 3
 Dublin have won the National Camogie League on three occasions (click on year for the teams): in 1979, 1981, 1983.

Camogie All Stars Awards: 1
 Ciara Lucey - 2005
 Louise O'Hara - 2006

The Camogie All Stars first began in 2004.

Handball

Senior Hardball Singles

Senior Softball Singles

See also
 Dublin county football team
 Dublin GAA

References

Honours